Dudley Perkins may refer to:

 Dudley Perkins (soldier) (1915–1944), New Zealand soldier
 Dudley Perkins (broadcaster), BBC Radio broadcaster and writer on legal and consumer matters
 Dudley Perkins (motorcyclist) (1893–1978), American champion hillclimb competitor and Harley-Davidson motorcycle dealer
 Dudley Perkins (rapper), American rapper and singer from Oxnard, California
 F. Dudley Perkins (1875–1960), American football player and coach